Otto Tausk (born 1970 in Utrecht) is a Dutch conductor.

Biography
Tausk was a violin student of Viktor Liberman and István Párkányi.  He studied conducting with Jurjen Hempel and Kenneth Montgomery.  He continued his music studies with Jonas Aleksa at the Vilnius conservatory.

Tausk was principal conductor of the Ensemble MAE (Maarten Altena Ensemble) from 2001 to 2007.  Tausk served as an assistant conductor with the Rotterdam Philharmonic Orchestra from 2004 to 2006.  From 2007 to 2012, Tausk was chief conductor of Holland Symfonia, during which time he received the de Olifant prize from the city of Haarlem.  In 2012 and 2014, he was jury chairman of the AVRO television program Maestro.
 
In March 2004, Tausk conducted the posthumous premiere of Protesilaos en Laodamia, an uncompleted opera by Rudolf Escher in a performing version realised by Willem Boogman.  His other work related to contemporary music has included conducting the June 2006 premiere of Michel van der Aa's After Life, at De Nederlandse Opera.

Outside of the Netherlands, Tausk has been chief conductor of the Sinfonieorchester St. Gallen and the opera of Saint Gallen since 2012.  His initial contract, through 2014, was extended to 2018.  His work in St. Gallen has included conducting the world premiere of Annas Maske by David Philip Hefti and Alain Claude Sulzer.  He stood down from his St. Gallen posts in 2018.

In January 2016, Tausk first guest-conducted the Vancouver Symphony Orchestra (VSO).  He returned for a second VSO guest-conducting engagement in January 2017.  In February 2017, the VSO named Tausk its next music director, effective 1 July 2018.  He held the title of music director-designate for the 2017-2018 season.  In September 2020, the VSO announced the extension of Tausk's contract as music director through the 2025-2026 season.  
In September 2020, Tausk was announced as Chief Conductor of the newly formed Phion, Orkest van Gelderland & Overijssel, which combines Het Gelders Orkest and Orkest van het Oosten.

Tausk and his wife have two sons.

References

External links
 Official website of Otto Tausk
 Konzertdirektion Schmid agency biography of Otto Tausk
 Interartists Amsterdam agency page on Otto Tausk

Dutch conductors (music)
Male conductors (music)
1970 births
Living people
People from Utrecht (province)
21st-century conductors (music)
21st-century male musicians